Close One Sad Eye is the second album by the American rock band Kommunity FK, released in 1985 by Independent Project Records. It was reissued in 1993 by Cleopatra Records.

Track listing

References

1985 albums